The  were a class of ten 1st Class destroyers of the Imperial Japanese Navy in service before and during World War II, during which all ten were sunk.

Background

However, design issues with the Hatsuharu-class ships, notably their “top-heavy” design relative to their small displacement, resulted in extensive modifications, to the point where the final six vessels on order were named as a separate class. The redesign caused the new class to exceed the limitations imposed by the 1930 London Naval Treaty. An additional four vessels were ordered under the ”Circle-Two Naval Expansion Plan of fiscal 1934, and all vessels were completed by 1937. While the process of only giving numbers rather than names has ceased in 1928, these ships also bore the numbers Dai-65 to Dai-74. 

As with the Hatsuharu class, the Shiratsuyu-class destroyers were designed to accompany the Japanese main striking force and to conduct both day and night torpedo attacks against the United States Navy as it advanced across the Pacific Ocean, according to Japanese naval strategic projections. Despite being one of the most powerful classes of destroyers in the world at the time of their completion, none survived the Pacific War.

Design
In general layout, the Shiratsuyu-class vessels closely resembled the Ariake sub-class, or final version of the Hatsuharu class, differing only in the lower and more compact bridge design and the shape and inclination of the funnels. The hull retained the general configuration of the Hatsuharu class with a long forecastle with a pronounced flare to improve sea-keeping at high speeds by adding buoyancy and reducing the spray and water coming over the deck, but with a shorter forecastle and longer stern. The same engines were used as on the Hatsuharu class, and due to their greater displacement and draft, the Shiratsuyu-class  could only attain 34 knots.

The Shiratsuyu class were the first Japanese warships to be completed with quadruple torpedo mounts and telephone communications to the torpedo station. As with the Hatsuharu class. the torpedo launchers were given a protective shield to allow for use in heavy weather and to protect against splinter damage. The last four vessels (those ordered in 1934) differed slightly from their predecessors and resembled more the succeeding Asashio Class.

Propulsion
The Shiratsuyu class, as with the previous Hatsuharu class, carried two sets of Kampon geared turbines, one for each shaft. Each set consisted one low-pressure and one high-pressure turbine, plus a cruise turbine connected to the high-pressure turbine. The LP and HP turbines were connected to the propeller shaft by a two-pinion reduction gear.

This gave a ratio of 3.6 kg per shaft horsepower for the Shiratsuyu class compared to the 4.1 kg per shaft horsepower of their predecessors.

A single 100 kW turbo-generator was fitted behind the reduction gears in a separate compartment and two 40 kW diesel generators were located between the propeller shafts.

Armament
The Shiratsuyu-class destroyers used the same 50 caliber 12.7 cm/50 Type 3 naval gun as the Fubuki class, but all turrets could elevate to 75° to give the main guns a minimal ability to engage aircraft. During the war the single turret in "X" position was removed on all surviving ships and replaced with two triple Type 96 anti-aircraft guns, while other guns were added so that between 13 to 21 (depending on the individual vessel) of this calibre were eventually carried in double and triple mounts. Although these powered mounts were unsatisfactory because their traverse and elevation speeds were too slow to engage high-speed aircraft more single mounts were fitted to ships in the last year of the war. Four 13 mm guns were also added.

For example,  of the related Hatsuharu class mounted ten single 25 guns when she was lost in July 1945. Four license-built Type 93 machine guns were also fitted to Hatsushimo, but these were also of limited utility against modern aircraft.

The 61 cm Type 90 torpedo was mounted in quadruple tube Type 92 launchers, derived from the twin tube Type 89 launcher used in the  heavy cruisers. Shields were fitted to both the torpedo mounts and lockers to protect them from the weather and from strafing aircraft. Initially the shields were made from Duralumin to save weight, but these quickly corroded and had to be replaced. "NiCrMo" steel, taken from the air chambers of obsolete torpedoes,  in thickness, was chosen for the new shields to save weight. It was traversed by an electro-hydraulic system and could traverse 360° in twenty-five seconds. If the backup manual system was used the time required increased to two minutes. Eight reloads were carried, and each tube could be reloaded in twenty-three seconds using the endless wire and winch provided. Because of the weight of the extra guns added, one set of reloads for the torpedo tubes was removed, together with the minelaying and minesweeping gear. By the start of the Pacific War, all ships of the class were using Type 93 torpedoes.

Only eighteen depth charges were initially carried in a rack at the stern, but this increased to thirty-six after the autumn of 1942, with four depth charge throwers. Apparently no sonar or hydrophones were fitted until after the outbreak of the war when the Type 93 sonar and Type 93 hydrophones were mounted.

Radar
Radar was not installed on the surviving ships of this class until late in the war, possibly as late as 1944. Surviving ships were given a Type 22 radar on the foremast, a Type 13 on the mainmast and a Type E-27 radar countermeasures device was carried high on the foremast.

Operational history
None of the Shiratsuyu-class ships survived the Pacific War. The lead ship of the class,  was sunk northeast of Mindanao in a collision with the oiler Seiyo Maru. Most of the class were lost to US submarines, with Kawakaze, Yudachi, and Murasame being lost in surface actions. Only Harusame fell victim to aircraft. All ships in the class took part in either the Battle of Midway or the Invasion of the Aleutians.

  was employed in several campaigns, beginning with the invasion of the Philippines. In 1942 she participated in the Battle of the Java Sea and the Battle of Midway. During the Guadalcanal Campaign Murasame played a supporting role in the Battle of the Eastern Solomons and the Battle of the Santa Cruz Islands and was sunk at the Battle of Blackett Strait.

 was squadron flagship of Captain Tameichi Hara through much of 1942-43, and became one of the most famous Japanese destroyers of the war. She survived numerous battles in the Solomons until she was torpedoed and sunk off the Gulf of Siam by the submarine  in early 1945.

List of ships

References

Notes

Books

 

 OCLC 77257764

External links

 CombinedFleet.com: Shiratsuyu-class destroyers

Destroyer classes
 
World War II destroyers of Japan